Golovanov (in Russian Голова́нов, feminine form Golovanova/Голова́нова) is a Russian surname.

People with this surname include:
 Alexander Golovanov (1904–1975), a Soviet pilot and officer
 Alex Golovanov, a Russian Progressive House producer who goes under the name Mango
 Denis Golovanov (born 1979), tennis player
 Diana Golovanov (born 1992), an Israeli musician
 Elizaveta Golovanova (born 1993), Russian beauty pageant titleholder
 K. Golovanov, founder of the Drama and Comedy Theatre in Moscow in 1925, later Gogol Center
 Nikolay Semyonovich Golovanov (1891–1953), a Soviet conductor and composer
 Oleg Golovanov (1934-2019), a Soviet rower
 Sergey Golovanov (born 1968), a Russian Catholic priest of the Byzantine Rite
 Vladimir Golovanov (1938–2003), a Soviet weightlifter and Olympic champion
 Yaroslav Golovanov (1932–2003), a Soviet journalist and writer

Russian-language surnames